"Say Somethin" is the debut career single by American teen singer-songwriter and dancer Austin Mahone, released from his first EP, Extended Play. It was released June 5, 2012 and was his first big charting success. It combines modern teen pop of the 2010s with vintage pop of the 1950s and 1960s.

Chart performance
In 2012, Mahone's released the promotional single "11:11" that reached at number 19 on the Billboard Heatseekers Songs chart. The follow-up "Say Somethin'" did even better charting at number 34 on the Billboard Pop Songs chart.

Music video
The music video of the song filmed in a school setting was heavily played on teen-oriented music channels, giving him great media exposure. The video was directed by Evan Dennis.

Awards and nominations

Charts

Certifications

Release history

References        

2012 debut singles
2012 songs
Austin Mahone songs
Republic Records singles
Songs written by Maejor
Songs written by Mike Posner
Song recordings produced by Maejor